三田 (literally "three fields") may refer to:

In places

Mita, Minato, Tokyo (三田), a district of Minato, Tokyo, Japan
Mita Dōri (三田通り), a four lane avenue which forms the border between Mita 2-chōme and Shiba 5-chōme in Minato, Tokyo, Japan
Mita Junior High School (三田中学校), a junior high school in Tokyo
Mita Station (三田駅), a railway station near Mita, in Minato, Tokyo, Japan
Sanda, Hyōgo (三田市), a city located in Hyōgo Prefecture, Japan
Sanda Station (三田駅), a railway station in Sanda, Hyōgo Prefecture, Japan
Shin-Sanda Station (新三田駅), a railway station in Sanda, Hyōgo Prefecture, Japan
Santian Village (三田村), an administrative village in Zhenshang, Xinhua, Loudi, Hunan, China
Samjeon-dong (三田洞), a neighbourhood of Songpa-gu, Seoul, South Korea

In people

Hiroko Mita (三田 寛子), a Japanese actress
Norifusa Mita (三田 紀房), a Japanese manga artist
Yoshiko Mita (三田 佳子), a Japanese actress
Yūko Mita (三田 ゆう子), a Japanese voice actress

In other uses

Mita Industrial (三田工業), a former copier company, now a division of Kyocera
Shintetsu Sanda Line (三田線), a commuter railway line in Hyōgo Prefecture, Japan
Toei Mita Line (三田線), a subway line in Tokyo, Japan

See also 
Mita (disambiguation)